Flash Gordon is the protagonist of a space adventure comic strip created and originally drawn by Alex Raymond. First published January 7, 1934, the strip was inspired by, and created to compete with, the already established Buck Rogers adventure strip.

Creation

The Buck Rogers comic strip had been commercially very successful, spawning novelizations and children's toys, and King Features Syndicate decided to create its own science fiction comic strip to compete with it. At first, King Features tried to purchase the rights to the John Carter of Mars stories by Edgar Rice Burroughs. However, the syndicate was unable to reach an agreement with Burroughs. King Features then turned to Alex Raymond, one of their staff artists, to create the story.

One source for Flash Gordon was the Philip Wylie novel When Worlds Collide (1933). The themes of an approaching planet threatening the Earth, and an athletic hero, his girlfriend, and a scientist traveling to the new planet by rocket, were adapted by Raymond for the initial storyline. Raymond's first samples were dismissed for not containing enough action sequences. Raymond reworked the story and sent it back to the syndicate, which accepted it. Raymond was partnered with ghostwriter Don Moore, an experienced editor and writer. Raymond's first Flash Gordon story appeared in January 1934, alongside Jungle Jim. The Flash Gordon strip was well received by newspaper readers, becoming one of the most popular American comic strips of the 1930s.

As with Buck Rogers, the success of Flash Gordon resulted in numerous licensed products being sold, including pop-up books, coloring books, and toy spaceships and rayguns.

Comic strip characters and story
The Flash Gordon comic strip ran as a daily from 1934 to 1992, with the Sunday strip continuing until 2003. Reprints are still being syndicated by King Features Syndicate.

The comic strip follows the adventures of Flash Gordon, a handsome polo player and Yale University graduate, and his companions Dale Arden and Dr. Hans Zarkov. The story begins with Earth threatened by a collision with the planet Mongo. Dr. Zarkov invents a rocket ship to fly into space in an attempt to stop the disaster. Half mad, he kidnaps Flash and Dale. Landing on the planet, and halting the collision, they come into conflict with Ming the Merciless, Mongo's evil ruler.

For many years, the three companions have adventures on Mongo, traveling to the forest kingdom of Arboria, ruled by Prince Barin; the ice kingdom of Frigia, ruled by Queen Fria; the jungle kingdom of Tropica, ruled by Queen Desira; the undersea kingdom of the Shark Men, ruled by King Kala; and the flying city of the Hawkmen, ruled by Prince Vultan. They are joined in several early adventures by Prince Thun of the Lion Men. Eventually, Ming is overthrown, and Mongo is ruled by a council of leaders led by Barin.

Flash and friends visit Earth for a series of adventures before returning to Mongo and crashing in the kingdom of Tropica, later reuniting with Barin and others. Flash and his friends then travel to other worlds before returning once again to Mongo, where Prince Barin, married to Ming's daughter Princess Aura, has established a peaceful rule (except for frequent revolts led by Ming or by one of his many descendants).

In the 1950s, Flash became an astronaut who travelled to other planets besides Mongo. The long story of the Skorpi War takes Flash to other star systems, using starships that are faster than light.

In addition to Ming and his allies, Flash and his friends also fought several other villains, including Azura, the Witch Queen; Brukka, chieftain of the giants of Frigia; the fascistic Red Sword organisation on Earth; and Brazor, the tyrannical usurper of Tropica. After Raymond's tenure, later writers created new enemies for Flash to combat. Austin Briggs created Kang the Cruel, Ming's callous son. Prince Polon, who had the power to shrink or enlarge living creatures, the unscrupulous Queen Rubia, and Pyron the Comet Master were among the antagonists introduced during Mac Raboy's run. The Skorpi, a race of alien shape shifters who desired to conquer the galaxy, were recurring villains in both the Mac Raboy and Dan Barry stories. The Skorpi space-fighter ace Baron Dak-Tula became a periodic nemesis of Flash in the late 1970s stories.

International versions of the comic strip

King Features sold the Flash Gordon strip to newspapers across the world, and by the late 1930s, the strip was published in 130 newspapers, translated into eight foreign languages, and was read by 50 million people. In the 1930s and 1940s, several newspapers in Britain carried Flash Gordon, including the Scottish Sunday Mail. In France, his adventures were published in the magazine Robinson, under the name "Guy l'Éclair". Dale Arden was named Camille in the French translation. In Australia, the character and strip were retitled Speed Gordon to avoid a negative connotation of the word "Flash". (At the time, the predominant meaning of "flashy" was "showy", connoting dishonesty.)

However, events in the 1930s affected the strip's distribution. Newspapers in Nazi Germany were forbidden to carry the Flash Gordon strip, while in Fascist Italy it was restricted to two newspapers. In 1938, the Spanish magazine Aventurero, the only publication in the country to carry Flash Gordon, ceased publication because of the Spanish Civil War. The outbreak of World War II resulted in Flash Gordon being discontinued in many countries. In Belgium, artist Edgar Pierre Jacobs was therefore asked to bring the current Flash Gordon story to a satisfactory conclusion, which he did.

After the war's end, the strip enjoyed a resurgence in international popularity. Flash Gordon reappeared in Italy, Spain and West Germany, and it was also syndicated to new markets like Portugal and the Irish Republic. From the 1950s onward, countries like Spain, Italy and Denmark also reprinted Flash Gordon newspaper strips in comic book or paperback novel form. In India, Flash Gordon comics were published by Indrajal Comics.

Later years
The popularity of Raymond's Flash Gordon Sunday strip meant a daily strip was also introduced. This strip was drawn by Austin Briggs and ran from 1941 to 1944. After Raymond left Flash Gordon in 1944 to join the US Marines, the daily strip was cancelled and Briggs took over the Sunday strip. Although Raymond wanted to return to drawing Flash Gordon after the war's end, King Features did not want to remove Briggs from his position. To conciliate Raymond, King Features allowed him to create a new strip, Rip Kirby. After Briggs left the Sunday strip in 1948, he was succeeded by former comic book artist Mac Raboy, who drew the strip until his death in 1967. In 1951, King Features created a new daily Flash Gordon strip. This strip was drawn by Dan Barry. Barry was assisted during his tenure by Harvey Kurtzman and Harry Harrison, who both wrote scripts for the strip. Barry also had several artists who aided him with Flash Gordon's illustrations, including Frank Frazetta, Al Williamson, Bob Fujitani, Jack Davis, Sy Barry, Fred Kida and Emil Gershwin. When Barry left the strip in 1990, various artists and writers worked on Flash Gordon. The daily strip was ended in 1993.  The final artist to work on the Flash Gordon Sunday strip was Jim Keefe. Keefe was occasionally assisted on the strip by other artists, including Williamson, John Romita Sr. and Joe Kubert. King Features ended the Flash Gordon newspaper strip in 2003, although re-runs of Keefe's strip still appear in a few US newspapers.

Strip bibliography

 Sunday, Alex Raymond, 1934–1943 (with writer Don Moore, from 1935 onwards)
 daily, Austin Briggs, 1940–1944
 Sunday, Austin Briggs, 1944–1948
 Sunday, Mac Raboy, 1948–1967
 daily, Dan Barry, 1951–1990 (with writers Harvey Kurtzman, 1952–1953; and Harry Harrison, 1958–1964) 
 Sunday, Dan Barry, 1967–1990
 Sunday and daily, Ralph Reese & Bruce Jones, Gray Morrow, 1990–1991
 Sunday and daily, Thomas Warkentin & Andrés Klacik, 1991–1992
 Sunday, Richard Bruning, Kevin VanHook, Thomas Warkentin & Andrés Klacik, 1992–1996
 Sunday, Jim Keefe, 1996 - 2003

Unofficial
 L'Avventuroso (Italy) - Guido Fantoni, 1938
 Bravo (Belgium) - Edgar P. Jacobs, 1941

Critical reception and influence
Flash Gordon is regarded as one of the best illustrated and most influential of American adventure comic strips. Historian of science fiction art Jane Frank asserted that because of his work on Flash Gordon, "Raymond is one of the most famous science fiction artists of all time, although he never contributed an illustration to any science fiction magazine or book". Comic book artist Jerry Robinson has said "What made Flash Gordon a classic strip was Raymond's artistry and the rich imagination he brought to his conceptions of the future" and described the final years of Raymond's tenure on the strip as being characterized by "sleek, brilliantly polished brush work." The science fiction historian John Clute has stated that "The comics version of Flash Gordon was graceful, imaginative and soaring" and included it on a list of the most important American science fiction comics. In an article about Raymond for The Comics Journal, R.C. Harvey declared that Raymond's Flash Gordon displayed "a technical virtuosity matched on the comics pages only by Harold Foster in Prince Valiant". The Encyclopedia of Science Fiction stated that Flash Gordons "elaborately shaded style and exotic storyline" made it one of the most influential comics, and that its art emphasized a "romantic baroque".

Flash Gordon (along with Buck Rogers) was a big influence on later science fiction comic strips, such as the American Don Dixon and the Hidden Empire (1935 to 1941) by Carl Pfeufer and Bob Moore. In Italy, Guido Fantoni drew Flash Gordon in 1938, after the prohibition by the fascist regime. In Belgium, Edgar P. Jacobs was commissioned to produce a science fiction comic strip in the style of Flash Gordon. Jacobs' new strip, Le Rayon U ("The U-Ray") began serial publication in Bravo in 1943. This version had text boxes which described the action and the dialogue, in the style of many Belgian comics of the time, similar to Hal Foster's version of Tarzan and Prince Valiant. In 1974, Jacobs reformatted Le Rayon U in order to include speech bubbles. This version was published in Tintin magazine and in book form by Dargaud-Le Lombard. The British comic The Trigan Empire, by Mike Butterworth and Don Lawrence, also drew on Flash Gordon for its artistic style. In Thailand Flash Gordon was a big influence for classic thai comics character Chaochaiphomthong (เจ้าชายผมทอง)  (mean prince golden hair) a sword and magic hero created by Jullasak Amornvej in 1958 .

Flash Gordon was also an influence on early superhero comics characters. Jerry Siegel and Joe Shuster based Superman's uniform of tights and a cape on costumes worn by Flash Gordon. Bob Kane's drawing of Batman on the cover of Detective Comics No. 27 (the first appearance of the character) was based on a 1937 Alex Raymond drawing of Flash Gordon. Dennis Neville modeled the comics hero Hawkman's costume on the "Hawkmen" characters in Raymond's Flash Gordon comic strip. In Avengers: Infinity War, Iron Man mockingly refers to Star-Lord as Flash Gordon due to their similar appearance and both being space heroes.

Films
Most of the Flash Gordon film and television adaptations retell the early adventures on the planet Mongo.

Film serials

Flash Gordon was featured in three serial films starring Buster Crabbe: Flash Gordon (1936), Flash Gordon's Trip to Mars (1938), and Flash Gordon Conquers the Universe (1940). The 1936 Flash Gordon serial was condensed into a feature-length film titled Flash Gordon or Rocket Ship or Space Soldiers or Flash Gordon: Spaceship to the Unknown; the 1938 serial into a feature-length film entitled Flash Gordon: The Deadly Ray from Mars; and the 1940 serial into a feature-length film entitled The Purple Death from Outer Space.

The first Flash Gordon serial remains copyrighted, but the compilation made of the second serial, and the third serial itself are in the public domain.

Flash Gordon 1980 film

In the 1970s, several noted directors attempted to make a film of the story. Federico Fellini optioned the Flash Gordon rights from Dino De Laurentiis, but never made the film. George Lucas also attempted to make a Flash Gordon film in the 1970s, but was unable to acquire the rights from De Laurentiis, so he decided to create Star Wars instead. De Laurentiis then hired Nicolas Roeg to make a Flash Gordon film, but was unhappy with Roeg's ideas, and Roeg left the project. De Laurentiis also discussed hiring Sergio Leone to helm the Flash Gordon film; Leone declined because he believed the script was not faithful to the original Raymond comic strips. Finally, De Laurentiis hired Mike Hodges to direct the Flash Gordon film.

Hodges' 1980 Flash Gordon film stars former Playgirl-centerfold Sam J. Jones in the title role. Its plot is based loosely on the first few years of the comic strip, revising Flash's backstory by making him the quarterback of the New York Jets instead of a polo player. Raymond's drawings feature heavily in the opening credits, as does the signature theme-song "Flash" by rock band Queen, who composed and performed the entire musical score.

Riding the coat-tails of Star Wars, Superman, and Star Trek: The Motion Picture, Flash Gordon was not a critical success on release. Melody Anderson co-starred with Jones as Dale Arden, alongside Chaim Topol as Dr. Hans Zarkov, Max von Sydow as Ming, Timothy Dalton as Prince Barin, Brian Blessed as Prince Vultan, Peter Wyngarde as Klytus and Ornella Muti as Princess Aura. Produced by Dino De Laurentiis, with ornate production designs and costumes by Danilo Donati, the bright colors and retro effects were inspired directly by the comic strip and 1930s serials.

Brian Blessed's performance as the Hawkman leader Prince Vultan lodged the veteran stage and screen actor into the collective consciousness for the utterance of a single line – "GORDON'S ALIVE?!" – which, more than 30 years later, remained the most repeated, reused, and recycled quotation from both the film and Blessed's career.

The film's cult status led it to feature heavily in the comedy films Ted (2012) and Ted 2 (2015) causing a resurgence in interest in the film.

Unofficial films
In 1967, a low-budget Turkish adaptation of the comic was made, called Flash Gordon's Battle in Space (Baytekin – Fezada Çarpisanlar in Turkish). Hasan Demirtag played Flash Gordan.

Robb Pratt, director of the popular fan film Superman Classic, made Flash Gordon Classic, released in May 2015. The traditionally animated short features the characters Flash Gordon, girlfriend Dale Arden, sidekick Dr. Hans Zarkov, antagonist Ming the Merciless, and Princess Aura.

Possible future films
In 2010, Breck Eisner expressed interest to direct a 3D film version of Flash Gordon. Since April 2014, 20th Century Fox was developing the Flash Gordon reboot with J. D. Payne and Patrick McKay writing the film's script. Matthew Vaughn was in talks to direct the film. Mark Protosevich was hired to rewrite the film's script. Julius Avery was later signed to write and direct film, with Vaughn as producer alongside John Davis. An animated film was under development at Disney/Fox with Taika Waititi writing and directing. In August 2019, the animated film was believed to be canceled, but in July 2021, producers John Davis and John Fox revealed that Waititi was still working on the film, albeit it would now be live action instead of animation.

Television

Flash Gordon (1954–55 live-action)

Steve Holland starred in a 1954–55 live-action television series which ran for 39 episodes. The first 26 episodes had the distinction of being filmed in West Berlin, Germany less than a decade after the end of World War II. This is notable, given that some episodes show the real-life destruction still evident in Germany several years after the war. The final 13 episodes were filmed in Marseille, France.

In this series, Flash, Dale (Irene Champlin) and Dr. Zarkov (Joseph Nash) worked for the Galactic Bureau of Investigation in the year 3203. The actual timeline was established in one episode, "Deadline at Noon", in which Flash, Dale and Dr. Zarkov went back in time to Berlin in the year 1953. The GBI agents traveled in the Skyflash and Skyflash II spaceships.

The series was syndicated, appearing on stations affiliated with the long-defunct DuMont Network, and many other independent stations in the United States. It was recut into a movie in 1957.

Flash Gordon animated (1979–80)

In 1979, Filmation produced an animated series, often referred to as The New Adventures of Flash Gordon, though it is actually titled Flash Gordon. The expanded title was used to distinguish it from previous versions. The project was originally designed as a television film but NBC decided to change it into an animated series.

Flash Gordon: The Greatest Adventure of All (1982)

Filmation produced this successful animated television movie, written by Star Trek writer Samuel A. Peeples, before they began their Saturday morning series, but the television movie did not actually air until 1982. It was critically well-received, and is considered one of the best film versions of Flash Gordon, though it would never be re-broadcast following its premiere.

This movie has yet to be commercially released in the United States, although some sources indicate that off-air bootlegs are prevalent. The only known commercial releases were by VAP Video in Japan (catalog #67019-128), in 1983, in both laserdisc and NTSC VHS videotape formats; and in Bulgaria, where it was released on VHS "Van Chris" and "Drakar". The movie also aired numerous times on "Diema" Channel in the late 1990s. In the Japanese release, it is presented uncut with the original English voice track, with Japanese subtitles added for its intended audience. At the movie's ending is a trailer for the De Laurentiis live-action movie, as well as trailers for other titles from the VAP Video library at the time. The covers for both versions feature comic-strip panels, using stills taken from the movie.

Defenders of the Earth (1986)

In the 1986 cartoon Defenders of the Earth, Flash teamed up with fellow King Features heroes The Phantom and Mandrake the Magician in 65 episodes. This series took extreme liberties with all the characters, revealing that Flash and Dale Arden had conceived a son, Rick Gordon, who is in his mid-teens when the series begins. Dale has her mind torn from her body by Ming in the first episode and is preserved in a crystal, which Rick is able to recover and give to his father. Dale is reborn on Earth as Dynak-X, the strategic super-computer based in the Defenders' Headquarters.

Flash Gordon (1996)

In 1996, Hearst Entertainment premiered an animated Flash Gordon television series. In this version, Alex "Flash" Gordon and Dale Arden are hoverboarding teenagers, who become trapped on Mongo after stopping Ming's attempt to invade Earth.

Flash Gordon (2007–08 live-action)

A live-action series, comprising 22 one-hour episodes, was produced in Canada in early 2007. Under an agreement with King Features Syndicate, the series was produced by Reunion Pictures of Vancouver with Robert Halmi Sr. and Robert Halmi Jr. of RHI Entertainment serving as Executive Producers.

Sci-Fi Channel premiered its new Flash Gordon series in the United States on August 10, 2007.

The traditional primary supporting characters of Ming, Dale Arden, and Dr. Hans Zarkov were drastically altered. Eric Johnson, best known for his earlier work on the WB's Smallville, played the title character of Steven "Flash" Gordon. Gina Holden (who has appeared in Fantastic Four (2005) and Aliens vs. Predator: Requiem (2007)) played Dale Arden, Jody Racicot (Night at the Museum (2006)) played Dr. Hans Zarkov, and John Ralston portrayed the arch-villain, Ming.

Advertisements featured a cover version of Queen's "Flash's Theme" (from the 1980 film) performed by the band Louis XIV. The song was not present in any episode of the show.

Radio serials
Starting April 22, 1935, the strip was adapted into The Amazing Interplanetary Adventures of Flash Gordon, a 26-episode weekly radio serial. The series followed the strip very closely, amounting to a week-by-week adaptation of the Sunday strip for most of its run.

Flash Gordon was played by Gale Gordon, later famous for his television roles in Our Miss Brooks, Dennis the Menace, The Lucy Show and Here's Lucy (the latter two with Lucille Ball). The cast also included Maurice Franklin as Dr. Zarkov and Bruno Wick as Ming the Merciless.

The radio series broke with the strip continuity in the last two episodes, when Flash, Dale and Zarkov returned to Earth. They make a crash landing in Malaysia, where they meet Jungle Jim, the star of another of Alex Raymond's comic strips.

The series ended on October 26, 1935 with Flash and Dale's marriage. The next week, The Adventures of Jungle Jim picked up in that Saturday timeslot.

Two days later, on October 28, The Further Interplanetary Adventures of Flash Gordon debuted as a daily show, running four days a week. This series strayed further from Raymond's strip, involving Flash, Dale and Zarkov in an adventure in Atlantis. The series aired 60 episodes, ending on February 6, 1936.

Twenty-six years after he had played Flash Gordon in the last of the three Universal film serials (1940), Buster Crabbe again played Flash for two newly recorded audio-dramas released as the 1966 LP, The Official Adventures Of Flash Gordon (MGM/Leo The Lion Records CH-1028).

Stage
In 1989, Lee Ahlin and Gary Gordon wrote a musical for children, Flash Gordon, based on the comic. The musical premiered in 1989 in Oak Hall Performing Arts Theater in Gainesville, Florida. Flash Gordon starred Brian LeDuc as Flash, Kim Ehrich as Dale Arden, John Pelkey as Ming, and Julie Hamric as Princess Aura.

Comic books
Over the years, several publishers have produced Flash Gordon comics, either reprints or original stories:
 David McKay Publications King Comics #1–155 (1936–1949) [strip reprints]
 Dell Comics Four Color Comics #10, 84, 173, 190, 204, 247, 424, 512; Flash Gordon #2 (1945–1953) [first 2 strip reprints]
 Harvey Comics #1–5 (1950) [strip reprints]
 Gold Key Comics #1 (1965) [reprints FC #173]
 King Comics #1–11 (1966–1967) (also in Phantom #18–20)
 Charlton Comics #12–18 (1969–1970)
 Gold Key Comics #19–27 (1978–1979); under their "Whitman Comics" #28–37 (1980–1982)
Several issues of the King Comics series were drawn by Al Williamson, who won the 1966 National Cartoonists Society Award for Best Comic Book for his work on the series. Williamson later said: "I was paying homage to Alex [Raymond], you know. I tried to treat his creation with respect and dignity and tried to do it to the best of my ability. I find that other artists who have done Flash Gordon just don't seem to get the feeling of the strip, you know. Flash is a noble guy and it's kind of nice to have that kind of a hero". King also released a comic version as a part of their Comics Reading Library in the 1970s.

Williamson provided artwork for a Western Publishing adaptation of Dino De Laurentiis' Flash Gordon film, written by Bruce Jones. It was released by Western Publishing in both hardcover and softcover formats to coincide with the film's release, and was also serialized in three issues of Whitman's Flash Gordon comic book, #31-33, March–May 1981.

In 1988, Dan Jurgens wrote a modernized version of the comic strip as a nine-issue DC Comics miniseries. It features Flash as a washed up basketball player who finds new purpose in life on Mongo, Dale as an adventurous reporter who is just as capable as Flash, and a gray-skinned Ming who is less of an Asian stereotype. The series ran for the planned nine issues and was left with an open-ended conclusion. Though Mongo is not a threat to Earth in this series, Ming had every intention of conquering Earth once he coerced Dr. Zarkov into designing the needed ships.

In 1995, Marvel Comics published a new two-issue series, written by Mark Schultz with art by Al Williamson, in the style of the Flash comics Williamson had produced for King and others.

A new comic book series was released by Ardden Entertainment in August 2008, though with inconsistent release dates for subsequent issues. The series was written by Brendan Deneen and Paul Green and debuted in 2008, with the first arc entitled "The Mercy Wars". The initial story arc concluded in mid-2009. These were followed by further storylines. Ardden also published a Flash Gordon anthology entitled The Secret History of Mongo. Ardden's second Flash Gordon arc is titled Invasion of the Red Sword (2010). Two other arcs were completed.

A reprint of all of Al Williamson's Flash Gordon comic books in black and white was printed by Flesk in 2009.

In 2010, Dark Horse Comics began an archive reprint series in hardback, starting with the original comics published by Dell. The second volume covers the comics published by King Comics, the third covers the comics published by Charlton Comics, the fourth covers the comics published by Gold Key, and the fifth covers the comics published by Whitman.

In 2011, Dynamite Entertainment began a new series called Flash Gordon: Zeitgeist. The series is written by Eric Trautmann (Vampirella, Red Sonja), from a story and designs by Alex Ross (Kingdom Come, Marvels, Project: Superpowers) and illustrated by Daniel Lindro. The company also produced a spin-off miniseries, Merciless: The Rise of Ming, in 2012, with story and art by Scott Beatty and Ron Adrian. Following a crossover miniseries called King's Watch (where, much like Defenders of the Earth, Flash Gordon teamed up with Mandrake and the Phantom; albeit, set in the 21st century), Dynamite launched a new Flash Gordon ongoing series in 2014, with story and art by Jeff Parker and Evan "Doc" Shaner. In 2015, Dynamite followed this run with another Flash Gordon miniseries as part of their "King: Dynamite" series. This series was written by Ben Acker and Ben Blacker and illustrated by Lee Ferguson.

Flash Gordon Strange Adventure Magazine

In 1936, one issue of Flash Gordon Strange Adventure Magazine was published by Harold Hersey, featuring a novel about Flash Gordon, entitled The Master of Mars. It was written by little-known author James Edison Northford. The saddle-stitched novel was based (more or less) on the comic strip story lines, and included color illustrations reminiscent of Alex Raymond's artwork. On the back pages a second installment, The Sun Men of Saturn, was promised, but it never saw print. Even though the series did not gain in popularity, the lone issue of Flash Gordon Strange Adventure Magazine has become a much sought-after item for pulp magazine collectors.

Novels

Big Little Books
The Flash Gordon strip was adapted for the Big Little Books series by the Whitman Publishing Company in 1934; the books follow the strip stories very closely and were designed with a captioned illustration opposite each page of text. The series ran for 14 installments from 1934 until 1948. The books were:
"Flash Gordon on the Planet Mongo" (1934) 
"Flash Gordon and the Monsters of Mongo" (1935) 
"Flash Gordon and the Tournaments of Mongo" (1935)
"Flash Gordon and the Witch Queen of Mongo" (1936)
"Flash Gordon vs. the Emperor of Mongo" (1936)
"Flash Gordon in the Water World of Mongo"	(1937)
"Flash Gordon in the Forest Kingdom of Mongo" (1938) 
"Flash Gordon and the Perils of Mongo" (1940) 
"Flash Gordon and the Tyrant of Mongo" (1941)
"Flash Gordon and the Ice World of Mongo"	(1942) 
"Flash Gordon and the Ape Men of Mor"	(1942)
"Flash Gordon and the Power Men of Mongo" (1943)
"Flash Gordon and the Red Sword Invaders" (1945)
"Flash Gordon in the Jungles of Mongo" (1947)
"Flash Gordon and the Fiery Desert of Mongo" (1948)

Flash Gordon in the Caverns of Mongo (1936)
The first novel based on the strip, Flash Gordon in the Caverns of Mongo, was published in 1936 by Grosset & Dunlap. The credited author was Alex Raymond, but Doug Murray claims the novel "was almost certainly ghost-written". Like the pulp magazine of the same year, it failed to launch a series.

Avon Books
In 1973, Avon Books launched a six-book series of adult-oriented Flash Gordon novels: The Lion Men of Mongo, The Plague of Sound, The Space Circus, The Time Trap of Ming XIII, The Witch Queen of Mongo and The War of the Cybernauts. Although the books were credited to Alex Raymond, the first three were written by SF writer Ron Goulart (under the house name "Con Steffanson") and the other three novels were by Bruce Cassiday (the first under the "Steffanson" name, and the latter two under the pseudonym "Carson Bingham").

1980 film novelization
A novelization of the 1980 film was written by Arthur Byron Cover, and published in the United States by Jove Publications and in the United Kingdom by New English Library.

Tempo Books
In 1980, Tempo Books released a series by David Hagberg: Massacre in the 22nd Century, War of the Citadels, Crisis on Citadel II, Forces from the Federation, Citadels under Attack and Citadels on Earth. Except for the names of the hero and his co-stars of Dale Arden and Dr. Hans Zarkov, this series had little to do with any other version of Flash Gordon.

1939 World's Fair
The name "Flash Gordon" was emblazoned on the proscenium of a ride at the 1939 New York World's Fair. An article in Popular Science (March 1939) described how 150 people could enter a ride designed to resemble a rocket ship with a motion picture screen and vibrating seats for a simulated trip to another planet. The ride was located "at the opposite end of the amusement zone from the parachute tower". Fairgoers walked around a simulation of Venus as a jungle planet, inhabited by mechanical dinosaurs to enter a "Martian Headquarters", where "weirdly costumed Martians and mechanically animated models of giant beasts enact[ed] episodes from the adventures of Flash Gordon". The ride's Martians did not look like those in the 1938 serial, nor did the rocket ship.

Reprints

Raymond's work, particularly his Sunday strips, has been reprinted many times over the years by many publishers, most notably Nostalgia Press, Kitchen Sink Press and Checker Book Publishing Group.

Some of the Austin Briggs dailies were reprinted by Kitchen Sink Press. The King Comics run of Flash Gordon reprinted one Alex Raymond story and two Mac Raboy ones in 1967. The Mac Raboy Sundays have been reprinted by Dark Horse Comics in black and white, while Kitchen Sink began to collect both the Dan Barry and Austin Briggs daily strips. The Dan Barry dailies have never been entirely reprinted, but the Barry stories written by noted author Harry Harrison were reprinted in Comics Revue magazine, published by Manuscript Press. Tempo Books published six mass-market paperbacks reprinting Dan Barry strips from the 1970s in the 1980s. Two stories from the Dan Barry dailies, D2-133 "Baldur Battles Skorpi" (February 24 to May 10, 1986) and D2-134 "The Bear" (May 12 to August 21, 1986), were reprinted in an oblong format, 6.5 by 10.5 paperback edition with two strips per page by Budget Books PTY of Melbourne, Australia in 1987 under the title The New Adventures of Flash Gordon, . A reprint of all of Al Williamson's Flash Gordon comic strip and comic book work was released in 2009.
 Flash Gordon on the Planet Mongo (1934–35), Nostalgia
 Flash Gordon into the Water World (1935–37), Nostalgia
 Flash Gordon Escapes to Arboria (1937–39), Nostalgia
 Flash Gordon vs Frozen Horrors (1939–40), Nostalgia
 Flash Gordon Joins the Power Men (1940–41), Nostalgia
 Flash Gordon: A New Kingdom (1939) Pacific Comics Club/Club Anni Trenta, 1977 (limited edition for collectors)
 Flash Gordon: The End of Ming (1940) Pacific Comics Club/Club Anni Trenta, 1977 (limited edition for collectors)
 Flash Gordon: Return to Earth (1941) Pacific Comics Club/Club Anni Trenta, 1977 (limited edition for collectors)
 Flash Gordon: A New War (1941) Pacific Comics Club/Club Anni Trenta, 1977 (limited edition for collectors)
 Flash Gordon: The Usurper (1942) Pacific Comics Club/Club Anni Trenta, 1977 (limited edition for collectors)
 Flash Gordon: Gundar the Hawk of Tropica (1942-1943) Pacific Comics Club/Club Anni Trenta, 1977 (limited edition for collectors)
 Flash Gordon: The End of Brazor (1944). Pacific Comics Club/Club Anni Trenta, 1977 (limited edition for collectors)
 Mongo, Planet of Doom (1934–35), Kitchen Sink Press 
 Three Against Ming    (1935–37), Kitchen Sink Press 
 The Tides of Battle   (1937–39), Kitchen Sink Press 
 The Fall of Ming      (1939–41), Kitchen Sink Press 
 Between Worlds at War (1941–43), Kitchen Sink Press 
 Triumph in Tropica    (1943–44), Kitchen Sink Press 
 Flash Gordon, Dead or Alive!: Daily Strips 5/27/40 to 8/26/40 by Austin Briggs. Pacific Comics Club, 1981(limited edition for collectors)
 Prisoner of Ming : Daily Strips 8/27/40 to 11/13/40 / by Austin Briggs. Pacific Comics Club, 1981 (limited edition for collectors)
 Flight to Freeland: Daily Strips 11/14/40 to 2/28/41 / by Austin Briggs. Pacific Comics Club, 1981 (limited edition for collectors)
 Adora of the Forest People: Daily Strips 3/1/41 to 8/23/41 by Austin Briggs. Pacific Comics Club, 1981 (limited edition for collectors)  
 Flash Gordon: The Dailies by Austin Briggs 1940–1942 Volume 1, Kitchen Sink Press  (strips from 1940)
 Flash Gordon: The Dailies by Austin Briggs 1940–1942 Volume 2, Kitchen Sink Press  (strips from 1941)
 Flash Gordon The Complete Daily Strips 1951–1953, Kitchen Sink Press 
 Flash Gordon - Star Over Atlantis, Dan Barry, Manuscript Press, 2007, dailies 1953–1954.
 Flash Gordon: Volume 1 (1934–35), Checker Book Publishing Group 
 Flash Gordon: Volume 2 (1935–36), Checker Book Publishing Group 
 Flash Gordon: Volume 3 (1936–37), Checker Book Publishing Group 
 Flash Gordon: Volume 4 (1938–40), Checker Book Publishing Group 
 Flash Gordon: Volume 5 (1940–41), Checker Book Publishing Group 
 Flash Gordon: Volume 6 (1941–43), Checker Book Publishing Group 
 Flash Gordon: Volume 7 (1943–45), Checker Book Publishing Group 
Mac Raboy's Flash Gordon, Volume 1, Dark Horse Comics  (Sundays, 1948–1953 S32-S45)
 Mac Raboy's Flash Gordon, Volume 2, Dark Horse Comics (Sundays, 1953–1958 S45-S68)
 Mac Raboy's Flash Gordon, Volume 3, Dark Horse Comics  (Sundays, 1958–1962)
 Mac Raboy's Flash Gordon, Volume 4, Dark Horse Comics (Sundays, 1962–1967)
 The Amazing Adventures of Flash Gordon, Volume 1, Tempo Books  (S132/D2-097 - S135)
 The Amazing Adventures of Flash Gordon, Volume 2, Tempo Books  (D2-081, D2-082)
 The Amazing Adventures of Flash Gordon, Volume 3, Tempo Books  (S114-S118)
 The Amazing Adventures of Flash Gordon, Volume 4, Tempo Books  (D2-105, D2-107)
 The Amazing Adventures of Flash Gordon, Volume 5, Tempo Books  (D2-098)
 The Amazing Adventures of Flash Gordon, Volume 6, Tempo Books  (D2-102, D2-109)
 Al Williamson's Flash Gordon: A Lifelong Vision of the Heroic, Flesk 
 Flash Gordon: On the Planet Mongo: The Complete Flash Gordon Library 1934–37, by Alex Raymond, Titan Books 
 Flash Gordon: The Tyrant of Mongo: The Complete Flash Gordon Library 1937–41, by Alex Raymond, Titan Books 
 Flash Gordon: The Fall of Ming: The Complete Flash Gordon Library 1941–44, by Alex Raymond, Titan Books 
 Flash Gordon: The Storm Queen of Valkir: The Complete Flash Gordon Library 1944-48, by Austin Briggs, Titan Books 
 Flash Gordon Dailies: The City of Ice: The Complete Flash Gordon Library 1951-1953, by Dan Barry, Titan Books 
 Flash Gordon Dailies: The Lost Continent: The Complete Flash Gordon Library 1953-1956, by Dan Barry, Titan Books 
 Flash Gordon Sundays: The Death Planet: The Complete Flash Gordon Library 1967-1971 by Dan Barry, Titan Books 
 Flash Gordon Dailies: Radium Mines of Electra: The Complete Flash Gordon Library 1940-42 by Austin Brigss, Titan Books 
 Definitive Flash Gordon and Jungle Jim Volume 1: 1934-1936, IDW Publishing 
 Definitive Flash Gordon and Jungle Jim Volume 2: 1936-1939, IDW Publishing 
 Definitive Flash Gordon and Jungle Jim Volume 3: 1939-1941, IDW Publishing 
 Definitive Flash Gordon and Jungle Jim Volume 4: 1942-1944, IDW Publishing

Games
 The Flash Gordon & the Warriors of Mongo role-playing game was released by Fantasy Games Unlimited in 1977.
 The Savage World of Flash Gordon Roleplaying Game written by Scott Alan Woodard was released by Pinnacle Entertainment Group in 2018.
 Flash Gordon (pinball)

DVD releases
Flash Gordon has been released to DVD under a variety of titles and in both edited and non-edited versions. The serials and 1950s television series have no shortage of public domain DVD releases.

Film serials (1936–1940)

Flash Gordon (1936)
 Flash Gordon: Space Soldiers (245 minutes)
 Flash Gordon: Spaceship to the Unknown. Hearst Entertainment, Inc., 2002. (edited to 98 minutes)

Flash Gordon's Trip to Mars (1938)
 Flash Gordon's Trip to Mars (2 discs) (299 minutes)
 Flash Gordon: O raio mortal de Marte. Hearst Entertainment, Inc., 2002. (97 minutes)

Flash Gordon Conquers the Universe (1940)
 Flash Gordon Conquers the Universe (234 minutes)
 Flash Gordon: The Peril from Planet Mongo. Hearst Entertainment, Inc., 2002. (edited to 91 minutes)

Flash Gordon (1954–55)
 Flash Gordon (3 Volumes). Alpha Home Entertainment (only 13 of the episodes have been released thus far).

The New Adventures of Flash Gordon (1979)
US – BCI Eclipse
 The New Adventures of Flash Gordon: The Complete Series (4–Discs). 600 minutes
UK – Hollywood DVD LTD
 The Adventures of Flash Gordon – Castaways in Tropica
 The Adventures of Flash Gordon – Blue Magic

Flash Gordon (1980)
On May 6, 1998, Image Entertainment released the 1980 film on DVD in North America for DVD Region 1 territories through a contract with Universal, but it quickly went out of print.

Momentum Pictures later released it in the United Kingdom for DVD Region 2 territories on October 10, 2005. This edition of the film, the "Silver Anniversary Edition", features an anamorphic widescreen transfer at the film's 2.4:1 aspect ratio, both Dolby Digital and DTS 5.1 audio, the original Queen theatrical trailer, an audio commentary by director Mike Hodges, a second audio commentary from actor Brian Blessed, an interview with Mike Hodges, a photo slideshow and an original 1940s Serial, episode one of Flash Gordon Conquers the Universe.

Universal released the film on August 7, 2007 in North America and Region 1 territories once again. The new disc, entitled the "Savior of the Universe Edition", features a 2.35:1 anamorphic widescreen transfer and an English Dolby Digital 5.1 Surround track. Extras include an "Alex Ross on Flash Gordon" featurette in which world-renowned comic artist Alex Ross talks about the film and how it has inspired him in his life and work, a "Writing a Classic" featurette with screenwriter Lorenzo Semple Jr. and a Flash Gordon 1936 serial episode (chapter one of "The Planet of Peril").

Defenders of the Earth
US – BCI Eclipse LLC
 Defenders of the Earth – The Complete Series, Volume 1 (5 Discs) 33 Episodes
 Defenders of the Earth – The Complete Series, Volume 2 (5 Discs) 32 Episodes (Spring 2007)
UK – Hollywood DVD LTD
 Defenders of The Earth – The Story Begins
UK – Delta Music PLC
 Defenders of the Earth Movie (3 Discs)
 Defenders of the Earth Vol 1
 Defenders of the Earth Vol 2
 Defenders of the Earth Vol 3
 Defenders of the Earth Movie – Prince of Kro-Tan
 Defenders of the Earth Movie – Necklace of Oros
 Defenders of the Earth Movie – The Book of Mysteries
UK – Fabulous Films Ltd.
 Defenders of the Earth – The Complete Series

Flash Gordon (1996)
Lionsgate on September 21, 2004, released three 4-episode DVDs of Flash Gordon (1996) and Phantom 2040.
 Flash Gordon: Marooned on Mongo – The Animated Movie (97 minutes)

Parodies
Flesh Gordon (1974) is an American erotic science fiction adventure comedy film. It is an erotic spoof of the Universal Pictures Flash Gordon serials from the 1930s. The screenplay was written by Michael Benveniste, who also co-directed the film with Howard Ziehm. The cast includes Jason Williams, Suzanne Fields, and William Dennis Hunt. The film had an MPAA rating of X, but was also re-edited for a reduced rating of R. It has an original runtime of 78 minutes, and the unrated "collector's edition" release runs 90 minutes.

Several episodes of the spin-off series Star Trek: Voyager featured a holodeck program called The Adventures of Captain Proton, which features many elements lifted straight from the Flash Gordon serials of the 1930s.

The comedy film A Christmas Story (1983) featured a deleted scene with Ralphie and his Red Ryder BB gun saving Flash (played by Paul Hubbard) from Ming (played by Colin Fox). None of the footage from the scene survived.

In the comedy film Ted (2012), Sam Jones appears in character both as himself and as Flash Gordon. Jones reprised his role for the sequel Ted 2 (2015).

References

External links

 Flash Gordon at King Features
 
 

 
American comic strips
Charlton Comics titles
Comic strip superheroes
1934 comics debuts
2003 comics endings
Comics characters introduced in 1934
DC Comics titles
Dell Comics titles
Gold Key Comics titles
Fictional characters from Maryland
Fictional players of American football
Fictional astronauts
Film serial characters
Flash Gordon characters
Harvey Comics titles
Marvel Comics titles
Drama comics
Science fiction comics
Science fiction comic strips
Space opera
1935 radio programme debuts
1950s American television series
1970s American television series
Radio programs based on comic strips
Comics adapted into radio series
American comics adapted into films
Comics adapted into video games
Comics adapted into television series
Comics adapted into animated series
Superhero film characters
Male characters in film
Superhero television characters
Male characters in television
Male superheroes
Vigilante characters in comics